Megachile futilis is a species of bee in the family Megachilidae (Leafcutting Bees) and order Hymenoptera (Ants, Bees, Sawflies and Wasps). It was described by Mitchell in 1930.

References

Futilis
Insects described in 1930